This is a list of electoral results for the Electoral district of Mount Hawthorn in Western Australian state elections.

Members for Mount Hawthorn

Election results

Elections in the 1980s

Elections in the 1970s

Elections in the 1960s

Elections in the 1950s

 Two party preferred vote was estimated.

Elections in the 1940s

Elections in the 1930s

References

Western Australian state electoral results by district